A double referendum on tax adjustment was held in Liechtenstein on 1 March 1970. Voters were asked whether they approved of a tax adjustment for local government and a counterproposal from the Landtag. The first proposal was approved by 67.6% of voters, whilst the Landtag counterproposal was rejected by 66.8% of voters.

Results

Tax adjustment proposal

Landtag counterproposal

References

Liechtenstein tax adjustment referendum
Tax adjustment referendum
Referendums in Liechtenstein
Liechtenstein tax adjustment referendum